Donn Mitchell Roach (born December 14, 1989) is an American former professional baseball pitcher. He made his Major League Baseball (MLB) debut in 2014 with the San Diego Padres, and he has played for the Chicago Cubs and Seattle Mariners. Roach also has played for the KT Wiz of the KBO League, the Orix Buffaloes of Nippon Professional Baseball and the Uni-President Lions of the Chinese Professional Baseball League.

Career

Los Angeles Angels
Roach graduated from Bishop Gorman High School in Summerlin, Nevada in 2008. The Los Angeles Angels of Anaheim selected Roach in the 40th round of the 2008 Major League Baseball Draft. He did not sign, and attended the University of Arizona, where he played college baseball for the Arizona Wildcats. After one year at Arizona, Roach transferred to the College of Southern Nevada, a junior college, to play for the Southern Nevada Coyotes. He was then drafted again by the Angels, in the third round of the 2010 Major League Baseball Draft. Roach chose to sign with the Angels.

San Diego Padres

On May 4, 2012, the Angels traded Roach and Alexi Amarista to the San Diego Padres for Ernesto Frieri. He was added to the Padres' 40-man roster after the 2013 season to protect him from being selected by another team in the Rule 5 draft. He made the Padres' Opening Day roster in 2014 and made his MLB debut on April 2, 2014. Roach was designated for assignment by the Padres on November 3, 2014.

Chicago Cubs
The Chicago Cubs claimed Roach on waivers on November 12, 2014. He was designated for assignment by the Cubs on December 19, 2014, and began the season with the Iowa Cubs of the Class AAA Pacific Coast League. The Cubs promoted Roach to the majors in June. He allowed eight hits and four runs in  innings in his Cubs debut on June 27 as a starter, in a loss to the St. Louis Cardinals.

Cincinnati Reds
Roach was claimed off waivers by the Cincinnati Reds on July 13, 2015. He was designated for assignment on August 23.

Toronto Blue Jays
On August 25, 2015, Roach was claimed off waivers by the Toronto Blue Jays. He was designated for assignment by the Blue Jays on September 30, and elected free agency on October 14.

Seattle Mariners
He signed a minor league contract with the Seattle Mariners in December 2015. On August 6, 2016, Roach was designated for assignment.

Detroit Tigers
Roach was claimed off waivers by the Detroit Tigers on August 9, 2016. On September 3, 2016, the Tigers designated Roach for assignment.

Oakland Athletics
On September 5, 2016, he was claimed off waivers by the Oakland Athletics. He pitched in one postseason game for the Triple-A Nashville Sounds. On October 6, 2016, Roach was outrighted off of the 40-man roster and elected free agency on October 9.

KT Wiz
Roach signed with the KT Wiz of the KBO League on November 7, 2016.

Chicago White Sox
In February 2018, Roach signed a minor league deal to return to the MLB with the Chicago White Sox.

Orix Buffaloes
Roach signed with the Orix Buffaloes of the Nippon Professional Baseball on July 7, 2018.

Chicago White Sox (second stint)
On December 30, 2018, Roach signed a minor league deal with the Chicago White Sox. He became a free agent following the 2019 season.

Uni-President Lions
On January 11, 2020, Roach signed with the Uni-President Lions of the Chinese Professional Baseball League. He was released on June 18, 2020, after struggling to a 11.35 ERA and 2.26 WHIP over 23 innings pitched.

References

External links

1989 births
Living people
Sportspeople from the Las Vegas Valley
Baseball players from Nevada
Major League Baseball pitchers
American expatriate baseball players in Japan
American expatriate baseball players in South Korea
American expatriate baseball players in Taiwan
San Diego Padres players
Chicago Cubs players
Seattle Mariners players
KT Wiz players
Orix Buffaloes players
Bishop Gorman High School alumni
Arizona Wildcats baseball players
Southern Nevada Coyotes baseball players
Buffalo Bisons (minor league) players
Cedar Rapids Kernels players
Charlotte Knights players
El Paso Chihuahuas players
Gigantes del Cibao players
American expatriate baseball players in the Dominican Republic
Inland Empire 66ers of San Bernardino players
Iowa Cubs players
Lake Elsinore Storm players
Louisville Bats players
Nashville Sounds players
Orem Owlz players
San Antonio Missions players
Tacoma Rainiers players
Toledo Mud Hens players
Uni-President Lions players